The Tehama deer herd is a herd of deer in eastern Tehama County, California. During the 1950s and 1960s, the deer herd was California's largest, with more than 100,000 deer. As of 2001, the herd was reduced to 22,100 deer.

References

Tehama County, California
Deer hunting